Peter Mattei (born 3 June 1965) is a Swedish operatic baritone, particularly known for his performances in Mozart's baritone roles.

Biography 
Mattei studied at the Royal Swedish Academy of Music, and debuted in Mozart's La finta giardiniera as Nardo at the Drottningholm Palace Theatre in Stockholm in 1990. In 1993 Mattei starred as Pentheus in the Ingmar Bergman's TV-film Backanterna. He sang the title role in Mozart's Don Giovanni for the first time at the Gothenburg Opera in the 1994–95 season. In the same season, Peter Mattei performed as Figaro in Mozart's Le nozze di Figaro at the Royal Swedish Opera.

Peter Mattei made his international debut as Don Giovanni at the Scottish Opera in Glasgow, Scotland. He was then invited to the Théâtre Royal de la Monnaie, Brussels, Belgium and to the Aix-en-Provence Festival, France. His first appearance at the Salzburg Festival was in Beethoven's Fidelio, singing Don Fernando conducted by Sir Georg Solti in 1996. Claudio Abbado selected him as the bass soloist in Bach's St. Matthew Passion with the Berlin Philharmonic Orchestra. In 2002, Peter Mattei made his first appearance at the Metropolitan Opera as Count Almaviva in Mozart's The Marriage of Figaro. This role has been followed by, among others the title role in Mozart's Don Giovanni in 2003 and Figaro in Rossini's The Barber of Seville in 2006. With Don Giovanni he made a very successful debut at La Scala in Milan, opening the 2011–2012 season.

Personal life 
Mattei lives in Bromma, Sweden. He is married and has two daughters. Mattei can also play the piano, the accordion and the double bass.

Awards
2002: received 44th Annual Grammy Awards for participation in the album Berlioz: Les Troyens in two categories: Best Classical Album and Best Opera Recording
2006: appointed Hovsångare by H.M. the King of Sweden

Sources
Fredén, Jonas, "Peter Mattei puts Luleå on the musical map", Swedish Institute, 9 January 2009. Accessed 30 October 2009.
Metropolitan Opera, Mattei, Peter (Baritone), performance record on the MetOpera Database. Accessed 30 October 2009.
Wasserman, Adam, "Midnight Son" (cover story), Opera News, November 2006, vol 71, no. 5. Accessed 30 October 2009.

References

External links
 
Peter Mattei, entry in the Deutsches Musikarchiv
Biography and discography on Naxos Records
Official biography and photographs, Ann Braathen Artist Management

Swedish operatic baritones
Litteris et Artibus recipients
1965 births
Living people
People from Piteå
20th-century Swedish  male opera singers
21st-century Swedish male  opera singers